Acrolepia rungsella is a moth of the family Acrolepiidae. It was described by Daniel Lucas in 1943. It is found in Morocco.

References

Moths described in 1943
Acrolepiidae